= Inside Asia =

Former American television program

Inside Asia was a weekly, 30-minute feature program on CNN International in the late 1990s the focused on current events, trends, culture and entertainment in Asia. During its first few years, the program was hosted by CNN Hong Kong anchor Patricia Chew, and included reports from CNN correspondents throughout Asia.

Its success resulted in the creation of additional "Inside" programs at CNN International - Inside Africa and Inside the Middle East.
